The Parlamentarische Linke (abbreviated PL) is a platform within the Social Democratic Party of Germany (SPD)'s Bundestag group. As of 2022, 96 of the group's 206 members belong to the Parliamentary Left, making it the largest of the three extant platforms in the SPD group, alongside the Seeheimer Kreis and Berlin Network. The Parliamentary Left represents social democratic positions within the party.

The platform has three speakers: Matthias Miersch, Sönke Rix and Wiebke Esdar. Elisabeth Kaiser is the platform treasurer. Other prominent members include SPD group chairman Rolf Mützenich and party co-leader Saskia Esken.

Profile
The Parliamentary Left describes itself as "an association of social democratic members of the Bundestag". It represents the left wing of the Social Democratic Party, "advoca[ting] for freedom, equality and social progress". Their principles are essentially based on the party program that existed until the 1990s. To this end, the platform supports Keynesian approaches to economic and social policy. They were critical of the largely supply-side Agenda 2010 reforms of Gerhard Schröder's government, but officially called for their amendment rather than repeal.

In the area of tax policy, the PL call for a higher inheritance tax and the reintroduction of the wealth tax. They reject proposals for a strict limitation of the national debt, and opposed the introduction of the debt brake. They support efforts to combat climate change, including internationally-agreed climate targets, strong investment in renewable energy, and changes to subsidies and taxes for this purpose. In light of the record debt taken on by the federal government during the COVID-19 pandemic in Germany, the PL advocates a long-term move away from balanced budget principles, pushing for public investment in education, digitisation, and climate.

The Parliamentary Left favours closer ties with the Greens and The Left and the development of red-red-green coalitions; the first such coalition in a western state was formed in 2019 under the leadership of Carsten Sieling, former speaker of the Parliamentary Left.
The Left became the leading member of a governing coalition for the first time in the eastern state of Thuringia after the 2014 state election, alongside the SPD and Greens.

Organisation

History
The Parliamentary Left finds its origins in the "Group of the 16th Floor" (founded by 21 mostly young SPD Bundestag members in October 1969. This group was associated with the Extra-Parliamentary Opposition and pushed for reform within the SPD parliamentary group. The modern platform was officially founded in 1972, then known as the Leverkusener Kreis (Leverkusener Circle). It was refounded as the Parliamentary Left in 1980.

Spokespersons

Members
The following is a list of members of the Parliamentary Left as of January 2022.

References

1972 establishments in Germany
Social democracy
Social Democratic Party of Germany
Political party factions in Germany